The Department of Mineral Resources and Energy (DMRE) is a department of the South African government which is responsible for the mining industry of South Africa, exploitation of the country's mineral resources, and the energy industry. It was known as the Department of Minerals and Energy until July 2009 when it was divided by President Jacob Zuma into the Department of Mineral Resources and the Department of Energy. In June 2019 President Cyril Ramaphosa announced that the two departments were to be reunited under the current name. The political head of the department is the Minister of Mineral Resources and Energy, who is assisted by a deputy minister.  the minister is Gwede Mantashe while the position of deputy minister is vacant.

References

External links
 Mineral Resources
 Energy

Mineral Resources and Energy
South Africa
Mining in South Africa
Energy in South Africa
Mineral Resources and Energy